Hargood may refer to:

William Hargood (1762-1839), British naval officer
, two British Royal Navy ships
, two United States Navy ships